Kamyshla is the name of several rural localities in Russia:
Kamyshla, Orenburg Oblast, a settlement in Azamatovsky Selsoviet of Matveyevsky District of Orenburg Oblast
Kamyshla, Samara Oblast, a selo in Kamyshlinsky District of Samara Oblast